The 2019 Shanghai Challenger was a professional tennis tournament played on hard courts. It was the ninth edition of the tournament which was part of the 2019 ATP Challenger Tour. It took place in Shanghai, China between 9 and 15 September 2019.

Singles main-draw entrants

Seeds

 1 Rankings are as of 26 August 2019.

Other entrants
The following players received wildcards into the singles main draw:
  Gao Xin
  He Yecong
  Hua Runhao
  Wang Chukang
  Wu Di

The following player received entry into the singles main draw using a protected ranking:
  Miliaan Niesten

The following players received entry from the qualifying draw:
  Kazuki Nishiwaki
  Wang Chuhan

Champions

Singles

  Yasutaka Uchiyama def.  Wu Di 6–4, 7–6(7–4).

Doubles

 Gao Xin /  Sun Fajing def.  Marc Polmans /  Scott Puodziunas 2–6, 6–4, [10–7].

References

2019 ATP Challenger Tour
2019
2019 in Chinese tennis
September 2019 sports events in China